Phoenix "Nick" Wright, known as  in the original Japanese language versions, is the fictional titular defense attorney and the main protagonist in Ace Attorney, a visual novel adventure video game series created by Japanese company Capcom. Phoenix is featured as the main protagonist in the first three games of the series, appearing as a supporting character in the fourth before returning as one of the protagonists of the fifth and sixth games. The character has also appeared in film, anime and manga adaptations of the series, a Japanese series of musicals and stage plays, and crossover video games such as Ultimate Marvel vs. Capcom 3 (2011), Professor Layton vs. Phoenix Wright: Ace Attorney (2012), Project X Zone 2 (2015), and Puzzle Fighter (2017) and has received a universally positive critical reception, described as a likeable character with a realistic profession.

Conception and creation

The idea of a lawyer was conceived when director Shu Takumi was searching for ideas for a game in which the player could discover lies or contradictions in statements. Takumi used his privilege as the director to cast himself as Phoenix. Phoenix was a private investigator who finds a body at his client's office and is arrested. As the lawyer who is assigned to his case is useless, Phoenix takes up his own defense. One staff member suggested that Phoenix should be a hamster; while this didn't happen, this early version of Phoenix did have a pet hamster.

His Japanese surname, Naruhodō, references the Japanese expression , which equates to the English "I see". This phrase is often used in Japan to express attentiveness to the subject at hand. Takumi chose the phrase to highlight Wright's inexperience; even though his name reads "I see", he may not in fact understand what is happening, something which may also be true of people using the phrase. It is also commonly used in mystery novels when investigating, a core gameplay concept of the series.

In English versions, Wright's name was localized to present a similar meaning to English-speaking audiences. His first name is also a mythical reference: to the phoenix, known for "rising from the ashes", an allusion to his almost impossible comebacks, or "turnabouts", during trials. This is referenced in the first game, in which the fifth case is titled "Rise from the Ashes". His surname is a pun, allowing for wordplay (such as "Right, Wright?" and "Phoenix Wrong"). Early brainstorming suggestions for Phoenix's name included "Cole" and "Wilton", but "Phoenix" was chosen as a name that would "stand out". The nickname "Nick" (used by his partner, Maya Fey) was chosen based on its believability and similarity to the sound of "Phoenix".

Characteristics and backstory
At the time of Phoenix Wright: Ace Attorney, Phoenix is a rookie defense attorney who usually accepts murder cases, attempting to exonerate his clients when there is seemingly incontrovertible evidence and testimony against them. Described as "goofy and single-minded", he often encounters unusual situations. Rather than simply arguing his case, Phoenix uses detective skills to gather relevant evidence and investigate the crime scene.

When he was in grade school, he was accused of stealing Miles Edgeworth's lunch money, and since he was in a small school, there was a class trial. During the trial, Edgeworth and Larry Butz stood up for Wright, saying the teacher and students had no evidence of Wright's guilt. The class trial was dismissed and the three students became best friends until Edgeworth moved away following his father's murder. Fifteen years later, Larry would reveal that he was the one who stole Edgeworth's money that day, paying it back in full. While Wright is surprised, Edgeworth gives the appearance that he knew Larry stole his money all along.

While a college student at Ivy University, Phoenix is accused of murder and successfully defended by a defense attorney named Mia Fey, who finds the true culprit to be Phoenix's apparent girlfriend and Mia's first cousin, Dahlia Hawthorne. After passing the bar exam, Phoenix becomes a defense attorney himself under Mia's law firm, Fey & Co. Following Mia's murder, Phoenix takes over the law firm, naming it Wright and Co., and also takes Mia's sister, a spirit medium named Maya, under his wing. Maya becomes Phoenix's assistant and legal aide, assisting him by setting him up with clients, and by searching for information and clues during cases. As the years pass, Phoenix takes on several cases to prove the innocence of those wrongly accused of murder, developing a name and reputation for himself. He also helps out Maya with the well-being of her younger cousin, Pearl, after her mother was arrested. However, in one case, he inadvertently presents forged evidence to the court, not knowing it was forged until it was too late, and is forced to turn in his attorney's badge. Adopting young girl named Trucy Enigmar as his daughter, Phoenix sets up the Wright Talent Agency, turning to playing piano and poker games for a steady source of income while supporting Trucy's career as a stage magician.

Seven years later, Phoenix is accused of murdering a man named Shadi Smith, who has no known past and is simply a wanderer. Phoenix hires a rookie defense attorney named Apollo Justice, who works for Phoenix's friend, Kristoph Gavin, a renowned defense attorney. During the trial, Apollo and Phoenix reveal that Phoenix had been set up, and Kristoph was the real murderer. After he successfully defends Phoenix in court, Apollo is brought into the Wright Talent Agency as their attorney, Trucy changing the name to the Wright Anything Agency. Phoenix continues to work behind the scenes, helping to bring the truth behind his disbarment to light, as well as implement a jury system to the fictional justice system. In the years after losing his badge, Phoenix also develops a talent for poker, which he plays to determine the intents of those around him by reading their body language ("tells"), and is said to be nigh unbeatable at it.

After clearing his name, Phoenix retakes the bar exam, regaining his badge and once again becoming a defense attorney. He also retains Apollo Justice as a protégé, and takes newcomer Athena Cykes under his wing as the newest junior attorney for the Wright Anything Agency. He later reunites with Maya in the fictional Kingdom of Khura'in and helps to change the country's legal system, after which point they become legal partners once again.

Appearances

Ace Attorney video games
In the first game, Phoenix Wright: Ace Attorney, Phoenix must contend with the loss of his mentor and fellow defense attorney Mia Fey. Throughout the game, Phoenix is hired to defend various people of murder, including his friend Larry Butz and Mia's younger sister Maya Fey. The game culminates with Phoenix defending rival prosecutor Miles Edgeworth from being convicted for the murder of Robert Hammond, an old defense attorney who was involved in the DL-6 case, wherein Edgeworth's father was murdered. Going up against Edgeworth's mentor, Manfred von Karma, Phoenix successfully defends his friend and clears him of all charges, and destroys von Karma's 40 year-long winning streak.

In Phoenix Wright: Ace Attorney – Justice for All, Phoenix once again defends Maya, and faces the prosecutor and daughter of Manfred von Karma, 18-year-old legal prodigy Franziska. In the game's climax, Maya is kidnapped by a hitman, forcing Phoenix to make the true killer admit his guilt, which results in his first loss. In the course of the game, Phoenix receives a magic Magatama from Pearl that is able to reveal whether a person is hiding a secret in their heart, involving the use of Psyche Locks.

In Phoenix Wright: Ace Attorney – Trials and Tribulations, it is revealed that Phoenix was framed for the murder of his girlfriend's ex-lover while in college. He was defended by Mia Fey, who had not taken a case since her first against Edgeworth the year before. Mia exposes the true murderer as Phoenix's girlfriend, Dahlia Hawthorne, who is later executed. Through Mia's actions and defense, Phoenix is inspired to switch his major to law. Phoenix must also contend with a fake "Phoenix" who posed as him in court and got his friend and former client, Maggey Byrde, a guilty verdict. Phoenix also faces the mysterious Godot, a prosecutor who appears to harbor a grudge towards him. It is revealed in the final case, that during his years at the university, he was dating Iris, a temple nun and Dahlia's twin, who posed as her sister to save Phoenix's life from the wrath of Dahlia.

During a case seven years prior to the events of Apollo Justice: Ace Attorney, two months after Trials and Tribulations, he was forced to forfeit his attorney's badge after presenting evidence that, unknown to him, was forged. Two weeks later, he adopted Trucy Enigmar after her father, his client Shadi Enigmar, became a fugitive. Trucy then renames his office the "Wright Talent Agency", becoming its CEO and one half of the represented talent, with Phoenix being the other half. At the time Apollo Justice takes place, he works as a pianist and plays poker at the Borscht Bowl Club. After being accused of murder himself and being successfully defended by rookie defense attorney Apollo Justice, he hires Apollo, reopening his law office as the "Wright Anything Agency". Wright uses the "MASON System" computer program to assist the player in piecing together the evidence from both past and present for the game's final case, where the circumstances regarding the day he was disbarred are fully explained.

Wright returns as the protagonist in the fifth main series installment, Phoenix Wright: Ace Attorney – Dual Destinies. Having regained his attorney's badge, he works together on cases with both Apollo Justice and newcomer Athena Cykes, striving to put the "Dark Age of the Law" to an end once and for all.

In the sixth game in the series, Phoenix Wright: Ace Attorney – Spirit of Justice, Phoenix travels to the Kingdom of Khura'in, where he reunites with Maya Fey, and discovers that defense attorneys are reviled throughout the kingdom, having a reputation of abiding criminals. He successfully defends his young tour guide and Maya when they are both accused of murder, putting himself at severe risk of falling afoul of the Kingdom's Defense Culpability Act, which states that defense attorneys of parties found guilty are to receive the same sentence as their client. Phoenix's actions begin the wheels of revolution turning, when he encounters a rebel group known as the Defiant Dragons, and finds out that their leader, a once renowned defense attorney named Dhurke Sahdmadhi, aims to restore the legal system to its proper state.

Other appearances

Phoenix Wright appears in a Japanese manga adaptation of the series, written by Kenji Kuroda, illustrated by Kazuo Maekawa and published by Kodansha. The series was published in the United States by Kodansha USA. An additional manga, published by Del Rey Manga, was released in the United States.

A Japanese musical based on the series, Ace Attorney – Truth Resurrected, staged by the all-female troupe Takarazuka Revue, cast actor Tomu Ranju as Phoenix Wright, using the English name rather than the Japanese "Ryūichi Naruhodō", featuring Phoenix in a romantic relationship with Leona Clyde, an original character based on Lana Skye and Miles Edgeworth. A sequel, Ace Attorney 2 – Truth Resurrected, Again, was produced after the first musical sold out on the first day. Three Japanese stage plays have additionally been performed by the Super Eccentric Theater in which Sho Kato portrays Phoenix, the latest of which (released in 2022 — delayed from a 2020 premiere by the COVID-19 pandemic) depicts a romance between Phoenix and Maya Fey.

Hiroki Narimiya portrays Phoenix in the 2012 live-action film Ace Attorney. The film loosely adapts the events of the first game, including Phoenix's first case, his meeting with Maya, and his defense of Edgeworth; the end credits sequence additionally adapt elements of the second game.

Phoenix appears as the lead character of the 2016 Ace Attorney anime series, which adapts the events of the first three games in the series over two seasons. He is voiced by Yūki Kaji in Japanese and Eric Vale in English. Phoenix also makes a background cameo appearance in the episode "Killing a Domineering Grannie" of Scissor Seven.

Within his own series, Phoenix makes a cameo appearance in Ace Attorney Investigations: Miles Edgeworth, a game starring his longtime rival Miles Edgeworth, as well as in its sequel, Ace Attorney Investigations 2. He also stars alongside Professor Hershel Layton in the 2012 Nintendo 3DS title, Professor Layton vs. Phoenix Wright: Ace Attorney, developed by Level-5; in the Japanese dub of the game, Narimiya reprised his role from the live-action film.

The developers of the crossover fighting game, Tatsunoko vs. Capcom: Ultimate All-Stars, had wanted to include Phoenix along with Franziska von Karma as a character on the roster, but had trouble designing additional moves besides his finger-pointing gesture. Though they had come up with an attack that used his catch-phrase "Igiari!" ("Objection!" in English), with the letters themselves used to attack the opponent, they found that localization would have changed the four-character phrase (in kanji) to a nine-letter word and would have unbalanced the game. Phoenix was also considered for inclusion as a playable fighter in Marvel vs. Capcom 3: Fate of Two Worlds, appearing alongside Miles Edgeworth as a cameo in She-Hulk's arcade mode ending. He appears as a playable character in Ultimate Marvel vs. Capcom 3. His fighting style sees him gather evidence on the field which he can use to either attack his opponent or save for a powerful courtroom confrontation.

Phoenix, along with Franziska von Karma, Mia Fey and Miles Edgeworth, appear as cards in the game SNK vs. Capcom: Card Fighters DS. Both Phoenix and his assistant Maya Fey also appear as a two in one solo unit in the crossover tactical role-playing game Project X Zone 2. Phoenix is mentioned in the Danganronpa series entries Goodbye Despair and Togami by Sonia Nevermind.

Reception
Phoenix Wright has generally been praised by critics for being a likeable character with a realistic profession. However, the older Phoenix Wright seen in Apollo Justice has been criticized as "aloof and inscrutable", with "his character's development...lost along the wayside." GameDaily called him the eighth greatest Capcom character, citing how he perseveres in the face of hardships. They also named him 20th on their "Top 25 Gaming Hunks." They included his hairstyle in the list of "weirdest hairstyles in gaming." Nintendo Power listed Phoenix as their 10th favourite hero, stating that while lawyers get a bad rap, Phoenix is one who defends the innocent. In 2009, GameSpot chose him as one of the characters to compete in their poll for the title of "All Time Greatest Game Hero". His appearance in Ultimate Marvel vs. Capcom 3 was also positively received, with Metro GameCentral describing him as "the star of the show." In 2012, GamesRadar ranked him as the 55th best hero in video games while UGO Networks ranked him as the 57th best hero in entertainment in 2010. GamesRadar also included him in a list of "The 30 best Capcom characters of the last 30 years", remarking that he has no power, and "isn't even that good of a lawyer when he starts out, but watching him grow is part of why we love him". Reviewing the characters of the series, Jason Mecchi of Screen Rant complimented how despite how "it would be easy for Phoenix to fade into the background [a]s the protagonist and perspective character of the game and its first two sequels," that the character's "goofy, insightful[ness] form the backbone of the first game in the series." concluding to praise the character's "unique and often humorous perspective of the world" despite a general lack of a "dramatic arc", and ranking them as the "most memorable" character in the game. Calling Phoenix "one of gaming's most enduring icons", the San Francisco Chronicle further praised Capcom's "dadification" of a character "popularly interpreted as bisexual" through his adoption of Trucy Wright.

Phoenix Wright's signature mannerisms, such as finger-pointing and cries of "Objection!", have become well-known, and were parodied in episodes of anime such as The Melancholy of Haruhi Suzumiya, Panty & Stocking with Garterbelt, No Game No Life and Maria Holic. Multiple video game characters have been compared with Phoenix based on their ideas of standing on trials, including Makoto Naegi from the Danganronpa series, or Takayuki Yagami from Judgment.

References

Ace Attorney characters
Capcom protagonists
Fictional characters from Los Angeles
Fictional American people in video games
Fictional Japanese American people
Fictional pianists
Fictional defense attorneys
Fictional private investigators
Male characters in video games
Video game characters introduced in 2001
Fictional American lawyers